Alexandru Ghica may refer to:

 Alexandru Ghica, Prince of Wallachia (1766-1768)
 Alexandru II Ghica, Prince of Wallachia (1834-1842), later regent (1856-1858)
 Grigore Alexandru Ghica, Prince of Moldavia (1849-1853; 1854–1856)